Venur or Venoor is a small village on the banks of the Phalguni river in Belthangady Taluk, Dakshina Kannada of Karnataka, India. It was once the seat of Jainism and the capital of the Ajila Dynasty. It is on the Dharmasthala-Moodabidri-Karkala route on the coastal religious circuit in the Karnataka State of India.

Ajila Dynasty
Venur is a small town in Dakshina Kannada District of Karnataka state situated on the bank of river Phalguni. Venur, though a small town, was once a great seat of Jainism. It was the capital of the Ajila Dynasty and one of the most prominent Kings of then Thimmanna Ajila built a colossus of Gommateshwara 38 feet high in 1604 AD. He was a direct descendant of Chamundaraya, who built one at Shravanabelagola. Venur colossus is the shortest of all the three Gommateshwaras within the radius of  around it. It also stands in an enclosure, on the same pattern as that of Shravanabelagola.
The Kings of Ajila Dynasty ruled here from 1154 AD to 1786 AD. The current descendant of the Ajila Dynasty is Thimmnnarasa Dr. Padmaprasad Ajila.

Bahubali Statue
Venur's claim to fame is the monolith of Bhagawan Bahubali also known as Lord Gomateshwara. The statue is supposed to have been sculptured by Beeru kalkuda. The statue stands facing westward on a high platform on the banks of the river Phalguni. (the others being at Shravanabelagola, Karkala, Dharmasthala, and Gommatagiri).

Mahamastakabhisheka
The last mahamastakabhisheka or the head anointing ceremony of the statue (typical of all the four Bahubali statues) was held in the year 2000. The second mahamastakabhisheka of this century will be held from 28 January 2012 to 5 February 2012 under the guidance of Acharya Vidyananda.
It will be inaugurated by D.V.Sadananda Gowda, Chief Minister of Karnataka.

Temples at Venur 
 Mahalingeshwara temple, Venur
 A yyappa swami temple, venur 
 shri rama mandira, rama nagar,  venur
 Akkangala Basadi or Eda Basadi - Timmanajila's first wife Padyakka Devi or Vardhamanakka built this temple with Lord Chandranatha as the main deity.
 Binnani Basadi or Bala Basadi - The second wife Parshwandevi or Binnani built the Shanthishwara Basadi called as Bala Basadi to the right of Bahubali idol.
 Parshwanatha Swamy Basadi - Records indicate that the renovation of this temple was carried out in the year 1936 by Swasti Sri Charukeerthi Bhattarakha Swamiji of the Moodabidri Jain Mutt.
 Kallu Basadi or Dodda Basadi or Shanthinatha Basadi
 Adinatha Basadi - This Basadi is situated to the left of Kallu Basadi. It has an idol of Lord Adinatha in padmasana as the main deity.
 24 Tirthankara Basadi/Ammanavara Basadi - An inscription found to the right of this temple mentions that it was built in 1537.
 Vardhamana Swamy Basadi

'Muhiyuddin Juma Masjid and Darga Shareef Venoor'
Venoor is a place where religious harmony can be seen. The Muhiyuddeen masjid is located on the bank of the Phalguni river and it is too close to venoor bridge. The Darga shareef of Sayyid Valiyullahi is also located near to Masjid where thousands of people visit every month.

Reaching Venur
Venur lies along the Dharmasthala Moodabidri Karkala route in the Belathangady taluk of Dakshina Kannada District. It is situated at a distance of 20 km from Moodabidri and 30 km from Dharmasthala. It has good approach roads from Mangalore, Dharmasthala, Moodabidri, Karkala and many other important places in Karnataka. The nearest railway stations are Mangalore and Udupi. The nearest airport is at Mangalore.

Accommodation
Venur is a small town with only one lodge as far as accommodation is concerned. People visiting the place should make arrangements at nearby places such as Dharmasthala, Moodabidri, Karkala and Mangalore.

As of 2015, the Government of Karnataka has built a new Yathri Nivas (traveller's accommodation). There are 3 double rooms and 5 single rooms. Also, built is a small dormitory and a hall where 50 people can be accommodated. Additionally, in the adjoining compound there are 10 bedrooms.

See also

References

Further reading

Shetty, Dr. S.D.. "Tulunadina Jaina Dharma - Ondu Samskruthika Adhyayana". Udupi: Rashtrakavi Govinda Pai Samshodhana Kendra, 2002.

External links
https://web.archive.org/web/20120110170040/http://www.venur.in/
https://web.archive.org/web/20150402155942/http://www.jainheritagecentres.com/index.php/news/news-updates/916-venur-mahamasthakabhisheka
https://web.archive.org/web/20160315160113/http://jainheritagecentres.com/downloads/documents/Religious_Conferences_%26_Cultural_Programmes-English_Invitation.pdf
http://www.deccanherald.com/content/202516/beauty-surrounds-monolith-venur.html

Villages in Dakshina Kannada district
Jain temples in Karnataka
17th-century Jain temples
Colossal Jain statues in India